Grishma the Sanskrit word meaning summer. This is one of the six seasons (ritu), each lasting two months, the others being: Vasanta (spring), Varsha (monsoon), Sharada (autumn), Hemanta (pre-winter), and Shishira (winter).

It falls in the two months of Jyeshtha and Ashadha of the Hindu calendar, or April and May of the Gregorian calendar. It is preceded by Vasanta, the spring season, and followed by Varsha, the rainy season.

References

Sources 
Selby, Martha Ann (translator). The Circle of Six Seasons, Penguin, New Delhi, 2003, 
 Raghavan, V. Ṛtu in Sanskrit literature, Shri Lal Bahadur Shastri Kendriya Sanskrit Vidyapeetha, Delhi, 1972.

Hindu calendar